Crkvine may refer to:
 Crkvine (Mladenovac), a village in Mladenovac, Serbia
 Crkvine (Stubline), a Neolithic locality in Stubline, Serbia
 Crkvine (Tutin), a village in Tutin, Serbia

See also
Crkvina (disambiguation)